Waterhouse is a rural locality in the local government area of Dorset in the North-east region of Tasmania.

History
Waterhouse was gazetted as a locality in 1959.

Etymology
The locality is believed to have been named Waterhouse due to its proximity to Waterhouse Island, which was named after Captain Henry Waterhouse of the Reliance by Captain Matthew Flinders.

Geography
Bass Strait forms the western and part of the northern boundaries. The Great Forester River forms part of the southern boundary.

Road infrastructure
The B82 route (Waterhouse Road) enters from the south-west and runs north-east and east before exiting in the north-east. Route C832 (Old Waterhouse Road) starts at an intersection with B82 and runs south before exiting.

References

Localities of Dorset Council (Australia)
Towns in Tasmania